This is a list of notable individuals and organizations who have voiced their endorsement of Elizabeth Warren's campaign for the Democratic Party's nomination for the 2020 U.S. presidential election.

Federal officials

U.S. Senators

Current
 Ed Markey, U.S. Senator from Massachusetts (2013–present); U.S. Representative from MA-05 (1976–2013)

U.S. Representatives

Current

 Raúl Grijalva, U.S. Representative from AZ-03 (2003–present)
 Richard Neal, U.S. Representative from Massachusetts's 1st congressional district (2013–present), from Massachusetts's 2nd congressional district (1989–2013)
 Katie Porter, U.S. Representative from CA-45 (2019–present)
 Jan Schakowsky, US Representative from IL-9 (1999–present)
 Jamie Raskin, U.S. Representative from MD-08 (2017–present)
 Jim McGovern, U.S. Representative from MA-02 (1997–present)
 Lori Trahan, U.S. Representative from MA-03 (2019–present)
 Joe Kennedy III, U.S. Representative from MA-04 (2013–present)
 Katherine Clark, U.S. Representative from MA-05 (2013–present) 
 Ayanna Pressley, U.S. Representative from MA-07 (2019–present)
 Andy Levin, U.S. Representative from MI-09 (2019–present)
 Deb Haaland, U.S. Representative from NM-01 (2019–present)
 Joaquin Castro, U.S. Representative from TX-20 (2013–present) (previously endorsed Julian Castro)

Former
 Berkley Bedell, former U.S. Representative from IA-06 (1975–1987) (deceased)
 David Bonior, former U.S. Representative from MI-12 (1977–1993) and from MI-10 (1993–2003); former House Democratic Chief Deputy Whip (1987–1991), former House Majority Whip (1991–1995) and former House Minority Whip (1995–2002)
 Sander Levin, former U.S. Representative from MI-09 (1983–2019); former Chair of the House Ways and Means Committee (2010–2011)
 Brad Miller, former U.S. Representative from NC-13 (2003–2013)

U.S. Cabinet members and Cabinet-level officials

Former

Julián Castro, former U.S. Secretary of Housing and Urban Development (2014–2017); former 2020 candidate for president; former mayor of San Antonio, Texas (2009–2014)
 Robert Reich, former U.S. Secretary of Labor (1993–1997) (co-endorsement with Bernie Sanders)

Sub-Cabinet-level officials

Former
Hady Amr, former United States Deputy Special Envoy for Israeli-Palestinian Negotiations (2014–2017); Deputy Assistant Administrator for the Middle East, USAID (2010–2013)
Richard Cordray, former Director of the Consumer Financial Protection Bureau (CFPB) (2012–2017)
Nicholas A. Klinefeldt, former U.S. Attorney for the Southern District of Iowa (2009–2015)
Mike Lux, former Special Assistant to the President for Public Liaison (1993–1995)
Joseph Y. Yun, United States Special Representative for North Korea Policy (2016–2018) U.S. Ambassador to Malaysia (2013–2016)

U.S. Ambassadors

Former

Robert Stephen Ford, former U.S. Ambassador to Syria (2011–2014), former U.S. Ambassador to Algeria (2006–2008)

State officials

Governors

Former
 Michael Dukakis, former Governor of Massachusetts (1975–1979, 1983–1991) and Democratic nominee for president in 1988

Statewide executive officials

Current
 Catherine Byrne, Nevada State Controller (2019–present)
 Michael Fitzgerald, Iowa State Treasurer (1983–present)
 Mike Frerichs, Treasurer of Illinois (2015–present)
 Maura Healey, Attorney General of Massachusetts (2015–present)
 Val Hoyle, Labor Commissioner of Oregon since 2019; Majority Leader of the Oregon House of Representatives (2013–2015) and Oregon State Representative (2009–2017)
 Kevin Lembo, Connecticut State Comptroller (2011–present)
 Denise Merrill, Secretary of the State of Connecticut (2011–present)

Former
 Elaine Baxter, Secretary of State of Iowa (1987–1995)
 Sally Pederson, Lieutenant Governor of Iowa (1999–2007)

State legislators

Current
Zack Fields, Alaska State Representative, from the 20th district (2019–present)
Andrés Cano, Arizona State Representative from the 3rd district (2019–present)
Isela Blanc, Arizona State Representative from the 26th district (2017–present)
Raquel Terán, Arizona State Representative from the 30th district (2019–present)
Scott Wiener, California State Senator from District 11 (2016–present) (previously endorsed Kamala Harris)
David Chiu, California State Assemblyman from District 17 (2014–present) (previously endorsed Kamala Harris)
Phil Ting, California State Assemblyman from District 19 (2012–present)
Robert Rivas, California State Assemblyman from District 30 (2018–present)
Lorena Gonzalez, California State Assemblywoman from District 80 (2013–present)
 Kerry Donovan, Colorado State Senator, District 5 (2015–present), Majority Whip
Mike Foote, Colorado State Senator, from the 17th district (2019–present)
Faith Winter, Colorado State Senator, from the 24th district (2019–present)
Dominique Jackson, Colorado State Representative from the 42nd district (2017–present)
Chris Kennedy, Colorado State Representative from the 23rd district (2017–present)
 Matt Lesser, Connecticut State Senator from the 9th district (2019–present)
 Mary Daugherty Abrams, Connecticut State Senator from the 13th district (2019–present)
 Edwin Vargas, Connecticut State Representative from the 6th district (2012–present)
 Josh Elliott, Connecticut State Representative from the 88th district (2017–present)
 Quentin Phipps, Connecticut State Representative from the 100th district (2019–present)
 Cindy Polo, Florida State Representative from the 103rd district (2018–present)
Omar Aquino, Illinois State Senator from the 2nd district (2016–present)
Cristina Castro, Illinois State Senator from the 22nd district (2017–present)
Kelly Cassidy, Illinois State Representative from the 14th district (2011–present)
Will Guzzardi, Illinois State Representative from the 39th district (2015–present
 Daniel Didech, Illinois State Representative from the 59th district (2019–present)
Janet Petersen, Iowa State Senator from the 18th District (2013–present) and Minority Leader (Democratic) (2017–present)
Claire Celsi, Iowa State Senator from the 21st District (2019–present)
Eric Giddens, Iowa State Senator from the 30th District (2019–present)
Zach Wahls, Iowa State Senator from the 37th District (2019–present)
Joe Bolkcom, Iowa State Senator from the 29th District (1999–2003), the 39th District (2003–2012) and the 43rd District (2012–present)
 Heather Matson, Iowa State Representative from the 38th District (2019–present) (previously endorsed Cory Booker)
 Jennifer Konfrst, Iowa State Representative from the 43rd District (2019–present) (previously endorsed Cory Booker)
 Beth Wessel-Kroeschell, Iowa State Representative from the 45th District (2005–present) (previously endorsed Cory Booker)
Liz Bennett, Iowa State Representative from the 65th District (2015–present)
Art Staed, Iowa State Representative from the 66th District (2013–present)
Tracy Ehlert, Iowa State Representative from the 70th District (2019–present)
Mary Mascher, Iowa State Representative from the 86th District (1995–present)
Mary Wolfe, Iowa State Representative from the 98th District
Lindsay James, Iowa State Representative from the 99th District (2019–present)
Rui Xu, Kansas State Representative from District 25 since 2019
Attica Scott, Kentucky State Representative from the 41st District (2017–present)
 Nate Libby, Maine State Senator from the 21st district (2014–present), Majority Leader of the Maine Senate (2018–present), member of the Maine State Representative from the 60th district (2012–2014)
 Brownie Carson, Maine State Senator from the 24th District (2016–present)
 Rebecca Millett, Maine State Senator from the 29th District (2012–present)
 Linda Sanborn, Maine State Senator from the 30th District (2018–present), Maine State Representative from the 30th District (2008–2016)
 Drew Gattine, Maine State Representative from the 34th District (2012–present)
 Christopher Babbidge, Maine State Representative from the 8th District (2014–present; 2004–2008)
 Ryan Fecteau, Maine State Representative from the 11th District (2014–present)
 Victoria Morales, Maine State Representative from the 33rd District (2018–present)
 Janice Cooper, Maine State Representative from the 47th District (2014–present), Maine State Representative from the 107th District (2012–2014)
 Jim Handy, Maine State Representative from the 58th District (2016–present), Maine State Representative (1982–1992), Maine State Senator (1992–1994)
 Thom Harnett, Maine State Representative from the 83rd District (2018–present)
 Charlotte Warren, Maine State Representative from the 84th District (2014–present)
 Ann Higgins Matlack, Maine State Representative from the 92nd District (2018–present)
 Anne Beebe-Center, Maine State Representative from the 93rd District (2015–present)
 Colleen Madigan, Maine State Representative from the 110 District (2016–present), Maine State Senator from the 25th District (2012—2014)
 Charlotte Warren, Maine State Representative from the 123rd District (2012–present)
 Anne C. Perry, Maine State Representative from the 140th District (2002—2010; 2016–present)
 Alfred C. Carr Jr., Maryland State Delegate from District 18 (2007–present)
Arthur Ellis, Maryland State Senator from District 28 (2019–present)
Mary L. Washington, Maryland State Senator from District 43 (2019–present)
Jen Terrasa, Maryland State Delegate from District 24 (2019–present)
Ariana Kelly, Maryland State Delegate from District 16 (2011–present)
Lorig Charkoudian, Maryland State Delegate from District 20 (2019–present)
Jheanelle Wilkins, Maryland State Delegate from District 20 (2017–present)
Nicole A. Williams, Maryland State Delegate from District 22 (2019–present)
Heather Bagnall, Maryland State Delegate from District 33 since 2019
Lesley Lopez, Maryland State Delegate from District 39 (2019–present)
Stephanie M. Smith, Maryland State Delegate from District 45 since 2019
Eric Lesser, Massachusetts State Senator from the 1st Hampden & Hampshire District (2015–present)
Karen Spilka, Massachusetts State Senator from Middlesex and Norfolk District 2 (2005–present); President of the Senate (2018–present); candidate for U.S. Representative from MA-05 in 2013
Jo Comerford, Massachusetts State Senator from Hampshire, Franklin and Worcester District (2019–present)
Julian Cyr, Massachusetts State Senator from Cape Cod and Islands district (2016–present)
Sonia Chang-Díaz, Massachusetts State Senator from the 2nd Suffolk District (2009–present))
Patricia D. Jehlen, Massachusetts State Senator from the 2nd Middlesex District (2005–present)
Natalie Higgins, Massachusetts State Representative from the 4th Worcester district (2017–present)
Jack Patrick Lewis, Massachusetts State Representative from the 7th Middlesex district (2017–present)
Jose Tosado, Massachusetts State Representative from the 9th Hampden district (2015–present)
Jon Santiago, Massachusetts State Representative from the 9th Suffolk district (2019–present)
Andy Vargas, Massachusetts State Representative from the 3rd Essex District (2017–present)
Rosemary Bayer, Michigan State Senator from District 12 (2019–present)
Mallory McMorrow, Michigan State Senator from District 13 (2019–present)
Laurie Pohutsky, Michigan State Representative from District 19 (2019–present)
Jim Ellison, Michigan State Representative from District 26 (2017–present)
William Sowerby, Michigan State Representative from District 31 (2017–present)
Megan Hunt, Nebraska State Senator from District 8 (2019–present)
Joyce Woodhouse, Nevada State Senator for Clark County 5 (Dual-member District) District 5 (2006–2010) and District 5 since 2010 (previously endorsed Kamala Harris)
Howard Watts, Nevada State Assemblyman from District 15 (2018–present)
Heidi Swank, Nevada State Assemblywoman from District 16 since 2013
Kevin Cavanaugh, New Hampshire State Senator from District 16 (2017–present) 
 Lee Walker Oxenham, New Hampshire State Representative from the Sullivan District 1 (2014–present) (previously endorsed Cory Booker)
 Jerry Knirk, New Hampshire State Representative from the Carroll District 3 (2016–present)
Edward Butler, New Hampshire State Representative from Carroll District 7 (2006–2010, 2012–present)
Sandy Swinburne, New Hampshire State Representative from Cheshire District 10 (2018–present)
Craig Thompson, New Hampshire State Representative from Cheshire District 14 (2018–present)
Larry Laflamme, New Hampshire State Representative from Coos District 3 (2016–present)
Yvonne Thomas, New Hampshire State Representative from Coos District 3 (2006–present)
Edith Tucker, New Hampshire State Representative from Coos District 5 (2016–present)
Richard Abel, New Hampshire State Representative from Coos District 13 (2014–present)
 Susan M. Ford, New Hampshire State Representative from Grafton District 3 (2008–2010, 2012–2016, 2018–present) (previously endorsed Kirsten Gillibrand)
Suzanne Smith, New Hampshire State Representative from Grafton District 8 (2008–present)
Joyce Weston, New Hampshire State Representative from Grafton District 8 (2014–present)
 Sharon Nordgren, New Hampshire State Representative from Grafton District 9 (1988–present)
Timothy Josephson, New Hampshire State Representative from Grafton District 11 (2016–present)
Mary Jane Mulligan, New Hampshire State Representative from Grafton District 12 (2016–present)
Laurel Stavis, New Hampshire State Representative from Grafton District 13 (2018–present)
George Sykes, New Hampshire State Representative from Grafton District 13 (2012–present)
Elaine French, New Hampshire State Representative from Grafton District 14 (2018–present)
Francesca Diggs, New Hampshire State Representative from Grafton District 16 (2018–present)
Pat Long, New Hampshire State Representative from Hillsborough District 10 (2006–present)
Nicole Klein Knight, New Hampshire State Representative from Hillsborough District 11 (2018–present)
Kathryn Stack, New Hampshire State Representative from Hillsborough District 21 (2018–present)
Wendy Thomas, New Hampshire State Representative from Hillsborough District 21 (2018–present)
Suzanne Vail, New Hampshire State Representative from Hillsborough District 30 (2018–present)
 (Switched endorsement to Amy Klobuchar)
Deb Stevens, New Hampshire State Representative from Hillsborough District 34 (2018–present)
Kat McGhee, New Hampshire State Representative from Merrimack District 40 (2018–present)
Jacqueline Chretien, New Hampshire State Representative from Hillsborough District 42 (2018–present)
Christopher Herbert, New Hampshire State Representative from Hillsborough District 42 (2014–present)
 Connie Van Houten, New Hampshire State Representative from Hillsborough District 45 (2016–present)
Mary Jane Wallner, New Hampshire State Representative from the Merrimack District 10 (1980–present), Majority Leader of the New Hampshire House of Representatives (2007–2010, 2019–present)
 Connie Lane, New Hampshire State Representative from Merrimack District 12 (2018–present)
Safiya Wazir, New Hampshire State Representative from Merrimack District 17 (2018–present)	
 Kris Schultz, New Hampshire State Representative from Merrimack District 18
 David Doherty, New Hampshire State Representative from Merrimack District 20 since 2014
Samantha Fox, New Hampshire State Representative from Merrimack District 23 (2018–present)
Rebecca McWilliams, New Hampshire State Representative from Merrimack District 27 (2018–present)
Liz McConnell, New Hampshire State Representative from Rockingham District 11 (2018–present)
Lisa Bunker, New Hampshire State Representative from Rockingham District 18 (2018–present)
Julie Gilman, New Hampshire State Representative from Rockingham District 18 (2012–present)
Gaby Grossman, New Hampshire State Representative from Rockingham District 18 (2018–present)
Debra Altschiller, New Hampshire State Representative from Rockingham District 19 (2016–present)
Rebecca McBeath, New Hampshire State Representative from Rockingham District 26 (2014–present)
Peter Somssich, New Hampshire State Representative from Rockingham District 27 (2016–present)
David Meuse, New Hampshire State Representative from Rockingham District 29 (2018–present)
Tamara Le, New Hampshire State Representative from Rockingham District 31 (2016–present)
 Matthew Towne, New Hampshire State Representative from Strafford District 4 (2018–present)
 Jeffrey Salloway, New Hampshire State Representative from Strafford District 5 (2016–present) (previously endorsed Cory Booker)
Chuck Grassie, New Hampshire State Representative from Strafford District 11 (2016–present)
 Casey Conley, New Hampshire State Representative from Strafford District 13
 Wendy Chase, New Hampshire State Representative from Strafford District 18 since 2018
Peg Higgins, New Hampshire State Representative from Strafford District 22 (2018–present)
Brian Sullivan, New Hampshire State Representative from Sullivan District 1
Javier Martinez, New Mexico State Representative from the 11th district (2015–present)
Gustavo Rivera, New York State Senator from the 33rd District (2011–present)
Alessandra Biaggi, New York State Senator from the 34th District (2019–present)
 Rachel May, New York State Senator from the 53rd District (2019–present)
Catalina Cruz, New York State Assemblymember from the 39th district (2019–present)
Jo Anne Simon, New York State Assemblymember from the 52nd district (2015–present)
Yuh-Line Niou, New York State Assemblymember from the 65th district (2017–present)
Linda Rosenthal, New York State Assemblymember from the 67th district (2006–present)
Carmen De La Rosa, New York State Assemblymember from the 72nd district (2017–present)
Harvey Epstein, New York State Assemblymember from the 74th district (2018–present)
Nathalia Fernandez, New York State Assemblymember from the 80th district (2018–present)
Patrick B. Burke, New York State Assemblymember from 142th District (2013–present)
Susan C. Fisher, North Carolina State Representative from the 114th District (2004–present)
Deb Butler, North Carolina State Representative from the 18th District (2017–present)
Jeff Golden, Oregon State Senator from the 3rd District (2019–present)
Sara Gelser, Oregon State Senator from the 8th District (2015–present)
Michael Dembrow, Oregon State Senator from the 23rd District (2013–present)
Shemia Fagan, Oregon State Senator from the 24th District (2019–present)
Tina Kotek, Oregon State Representative from the 44th District (2007–present) and Speaker of the Oregon House of Representatives (2013–present)
Julie Fahey, Oregon State Representative from the 14th District (2017–present)
Andrea Salinas, Oregon State Representative from the 38th District (2017–present)
Karin Power, Oregon State Representative from the 41st District (2017–present)
Barbara Smith Warner, Oregon State Representative from the 45th District (2014–present)
Alissa Keny-Guyer, Oregon State Representative from the 46th District since 2011
Diego Hernandez, Oregon State Representative from the 47th District since 2017
Carla Piluso, Oregon State Representative from the 50th District since 2015
Katie Muth, Pennsylvania State Senator from the 44th district (2019–present)
Danielle Friel Otten, Pennsylvania State Representative from the 155th district (2019–present)
Leanne Krueger, Pennsylvania State Representative from the 161st district (2015–present)
Brian Sims, Pennsylvania State Representative from the 182nd district (2012–present)
Edith Ajello, Rhode Island State Senator from the 1st district (2013–present)
Gayle Goldin, Rhode Island State Senator from the 3rd district (2013–present)
Moira Walsh, Rhode Island State Senator from the 3rd district (2017–present)
 Rebecca Kislak, Rhode Island State Representative from the 4th district (2018–present)
Teresa Tanzi, Rhode Island State Senator from the 34th district (2011–present)
Bridget Valverde, Rhode Island State Senator from the 35th district (2019–present)
 Liana Cassar, Rhode Island State Senator from the 66th district (2019–present)
Wendy Brawley, South Carolina State Representative from District 70 since 2017
Kambrell Garvin, South Carolina State Representative from District 77 since 2018
Gloria Johnson, Tennessee State Representative from the 13th district (2019–present)
José R. Rodríguez, Texas State Senator from the 29th district (2011–present) (previously endorsed Julian Castro)
Joe Moody, Texas State Representative from the 78th district (2009–2011,2013–present) and Speaker Pro Tempore (2019–present) (Previously endorsed Julian Castro)
Erin Zwiener, Texas State Representative from the 45th district (2019–present)
 Sheryl Cole, Texas State Representative from the 46th district (2019–present)
Mary González, Texas State Representative from the 75th district (2013–present) (Previously endorsed Julian Castro)
Art Fierro, Texas State Representative from the 79th district (2019–present) (Previously endorsed Julian Castro)
Shawn Thierry, Texas State Representative from the 146th district (2017–present)
Ghazala Hashmi, Virginia State Senator from the 10th district (2020–present)
Sam Rasoul, Virginia State Delegate from the 11th district (2014–present)
Chris Larson, Wisconsin State Senator from the 7th district (2011–present)
Jonathan Brostoff, Wisconsin Assemblymember from the 19th district (2015–present)
Jimmy P. Anderson, Wisconsin Assemblymember from the 47th district (2017–present)
Greta Neubauer, Wisconsin Assemblymember from the 62nd district (2018–present)
 Brian King, member of the Utah House of Representatives from the 28th District (2009–present), Minority Leader of the Utah House of Representatives since (2015–present)
 Karen Kwan, member of the Utah House of Representatives from the 34th district (2017–present)
 Luz Escamilla, member of the Utah State Senate from the 1st district (2009–present)

Former
 Daniel Biss, former Illinois State Senator from the 9th district (2013–2019)
 Steve Sovern, former Iowa State Senator from District 15 (1975–1976)
 Mark Kuhn, former Iowa State Senator from District 29(1999–2003) and the 14th District (2003–2011)
 Charles Bruner, former Iowa State Senator from District 37 (1983–1990) and former Iowa State Representative from District 41 (1979–1982)
Robert Dvorsky, former Iowa State Senator for District 37 (2003–2019) and from District 25 (1995–2003); former Iowa State Representative from District 49 (1993–1995) and for District 54 (1987–1993)(previously endorsed Kamala Harris)
 James R. Riordan, former Iowa State Senator from District 45 (1986–1992) and the 39th District (1993–1994)
 Dave Osterberg, former Iowa State Senator from District 43 (1983–1992) and District 50 (1993–1994)
 Kurt Swaim, former Iowa State Representative from District 94 (2003–2013)
 Beth Edmonds, Maine State Senator from the 10th District (2001–2009)
 Victor R. Ramirez, former Maryland State Senator for District 47 (2011–2019); former Maryland State Delegate for District 47 (2003–2011)
 Maricé Morales, Maryland State Delegate from District 19 (2015–2019)
 Tishaura Jones, former Missouri State Representative for District 63 (2009–2013) and Treasurer of St. Louis (2013–present)
 Lucy Flores, Nevada State Assemblywoman from District 28 (2011–2015)
 Chris Giunchigliani, former Nevada State Assemblyman from District 9 (1991–2006)
 Sheila Leslie, former Nevada State Senator from Washoe County District 1 (later District 13) (2010–2012), former Nevada State Assemblywoman from District 27 (1998–2010)
 Joe Neal, former Nevada State Senator from Clark County District 4 (1972–2004)
 Terie Norelli, former New Hampshire State Representative from Rockingham 16 (1996–2014) and former Speaker of the New Hampshire House of Representatives (2012–2014)
 Phil P. Leventis, former South Carolina Senator from Lexington County District 35 (1980–2012)

Local and municipal officials

Mayors

Current
Jim Kenney, Mayor of Philadelphia, Pennsylvania (2016–present)
Alex Morse, mayor of Holyoke, Massachusetts (2012–2021)
Regina Romero, Mayor of Tucson, Arizona (2019–present)
Christopher Taylor, Mayor of Ann Arbor, Michigan (2014–present)

Former
 Jackie Biskupski, Mayor of Salt Lake City (2016–2020)

Municipal executive officials

Current
 Larry Krasner, District Attorney of Philadelphia (2018–present)
 Scott Stringer, New York City Comptroller (2014–present)
 Rachael Rollins, District Attorney of Suffolk County (2019–present)
 Lina Hidalgo, Harris County, Texas judge (2019–Present)

Former
Mark J. Green, former New York City Public Advocate (1994–2001)

Municipal legislators

Current
Lydia Edwards, Boston, MA City Councilor, District 1 (2017–Present)
Natasha Harper-Madison, Austin City Council Member, District 1 (2019–present)
 Ann Kitchen, Austin City Council Member, District 5 (2015–present)
Leslie Pool, Austin City Council Member, District 7 (2015–present)
Paige Ellis, Austin City Council Member, District 8 (2019–present)
Kathie Tovo, Austin City Council Member, District 9 (2015–present)
 Michelle Wu, Boston, Massachusetts City Councilor, at-large (2014–present)
 Maria Hadden, Chicago City Council Alderman from the 49th ward (2019–present)
 Matt Martin, Chicago City Council Alderman from the 47th ward (2019–present)
 Costa Constantinides, New York City Councilman from District 22 (2014–present)
 Ben Kallos, New York City Councilman from District 5 (2014–present)
 Brad Lander, New York City Councilman from District 39 (2010–present)
 Antonio Reynoso, New York City Councilman from District 34 (2014–present)
 Jimmy Van Bramer, New York City Councilman from the 26th District (2010–present)
 Jamie Gauthier, Philadelphia City Councilmember from the 3rd District (2020–present)
 Chloe Eudaly, Portland, Oregon City Councilmember (2016–present)
Dale Miller, Cuyahoga County, Ohio Councilman from the 2nd District (2011–present)
Kelly Kosek, Strongsville, Ohio Councilwoman from the 3rd ward (2018–present)
Shammas Malik, Akron, Ohio City Councilman from the 8th ward (2020–present)
Michaela Burriss, Upper Arlington, Ohio City Councilwoman (2020–present)
Jocelyn Rhynard, Dayton Public Schools School Board representative-at-large (2018–present)
Sheena Barnes, Toledo Public Schools School Board representative-at-large (2020–present)

Former

 Tameika Isaac Devine, Columbia, South Carolina City Council Member At-Large (2002–2022)
 Marty Gelfand, former South Euclid, Ohio City Councilman-at-large (2012–2020)

County officials

Current
Brandon Johnson, Cook County commissioner from the 1st district since 2018

Party officials

DNC members
 Mark Brewer, former Chair of the Michigan Democratic Party (1995–2013)
 Kate Donaghue, DNC member from Massachusetts
 Alex Goff, DNC member from Nevada
 Allison Stephens, DNC member from Nevada
 Kathleen Sullivan, DNC member from New Hampshire; former New Hampshire Democratic Party Chair (1997–2007)
 Celina Vasquez, DNC member from Texas

Notable individuals

Athletes and sports figures
 Layshia Clarendon, American basketball player for the Connecticut Sun and activist
 Chris Mosier, triathlete and activist
 Megan Rapinoe, American professional soccer player
 Adam Rippon, American Olympic figure skater

Businesspeople
 Franklin Leonard, film executive
 Ellen Pao, investor and activist

Entertainers and artists
 Charlie Adler, voice actor, director and activist
 Cristela Alonzo, comedian, actress, writer and producer
 Elizabeth Banks, actress, director, writer, and producer
 Ike Barinholtz, comedian, actor, writer, director, producer and screenwriter
 Lance Bass, singer, dancer, actor, film and television producer, and author
 Bobby Berk, interior designer and television personality
 Jello Biafra, punk rock singer of the Dead Kennedys, Green Party candidate in the 2000 United States presidential election, 1979 candidate for mayor of San Francisco, CA (Co-endorsement with Bernie Sanders)
 Iram Parveen Bilal, filmmaker and entrepreneur
 Ashley Nicole Black, actress and writer
 Steve Blum, voice actor
 Lilan Bowden, actress
 Liam O'Brien, voice actor, writer and director
 Yvette Nicole Brown, actress
 Karen Chee, comedian, essayist, comedy writer
 Shea Couleé, drag queen and reality TV personality
 Grey DeLisle, voice actress
 Ramona Diaz, filmmaker
 Melissa Etheridge, singer-songwriter, guitarist, and activist
 Ben Feldman, actor
 Sally Field, actress and author
 Jane Fonda, actress and activist
 Travon Free, comedian, actor, and writer
 Kathy Griffin, comedian
 Jennifer Hale, voice actress
 Barry Jenkins, filmmaker
 Scarlett Johansson, actress, singer and producer
 Jon St. John, voice actor
 Ashley Judd, actress and activist
 Michael Kang, film director
 Amanda Winn Lee, voice actress
 John Legend, singer
 Jonathan Meiburg, writer, musician, and Shearwater bandleader
 Jennifer Siebel Newsom, filmmaker and First Partner of California
 Rosie O'Donnell, comedian and television personality
 Annabel Park, filmmaker
 Piper Perabo, actress
 Busy Philipps, actress and writer
 PJ Raval, cinematographer and filmmaker
 Tasha Reign, pornographic actress
 Eden Riegel, voice actress
 Angela Robinson, actress and singer
 Adam Savage, former host of MythBusters and special effects designer 
 Amy Schumer, actress and activist
 Adam Scott, actor, comedian, producer, and podcaster
 Martin Sheen, actor
 Alex Skolnick, guitarist for Testament
 Jill Soloway, television creator, showrunner, director and writer
 Amber Tamblyn, actress, writer and director
 Courtenay Taylor, voice actress
 Chrissy Teigen, model, television personality, and author
 Renee Tajima-Peña, filmmaker
 Jonathan Van Ness, hairdresser, podcaster, and television personality
 Constance Wu, actress
 Jenny Yang, comedian and writer
 Danny Zuker, television writer and producer

Political activists
 Ady Barkan, healthcare activist and attorney
 Tracy Chou, activist and software engineer
 Charlotte Clymer, LGBT+ activist and writer
 Patrisse Cullors, co-founder of Black Lives Matter (co-endorsement with Bernie Sanders)
 Gisele Barreto Fetterman, activist and Second Lady of Pennsylvania
 Gavin Grimm, anti-bathroom bill activist
 Lori Kido Lopez, media activist and Professor of Media and Cultural Studies at the University of Wisconsin-Madison
 Ashlee Marie Preston, transgender rights activist, journalist, former California State Assembly candidate.
 Urvashi Vaid, author, attorney, and LGBTQ rights activist
 Rhiana Gunn-Wright, one of the key policy architects of the Green New Deal

Religious leaders
Bruce Reyes-Chow, American Teaching Elder (minister) of the Presbyterian Church

Writers, experts, and commentators
 Gina Apostol, writer
 Dean Baker, macroeconomist and co-founder of the Center for Economic and Policy Research
 Loryn Brantz, author, illustrator and activist
 Rabia Chaudry, writer, attorney, podcast host
 Esther Choo, emergency physician and associate professor at the Oregon Health & Science University
 Arthur Chu, columnist, Jeopardy! champion
 Nicole Chung, writer and editor
 Gerry Conway, comic book writer
 Robert Creamer, political consultant, community organizer, and author
 Art Cullen, editor of the Storm Lake Times
 Anil Dash, blogger and entrepreneur
 Steven DeKnight, screenwriter, producer, director, creator of Spartacus
 Gabe Dunn, writer, actress, journalist, comedian, LGBTQ activist, and podcaster
 Annie Fox, writer
 Jeff Faux, founder of the Economic Policy Institute
 Roxane Gay, writer, professor, editor, and commentator
 Marshall Ganz, professor of community organizing and grassroots organizing at the Harvard Kennedy School at Harvard University
 Gayatri Gopinath, associate professor of Social and Cultural Analysis and director of the Center for the Study of Gender and Sexuality at New York University
 Rhiana Gunn-Wright, social and environmental policy expert and one of the architects of the Green New Deal
 Jenny Han, writer
 Gish Jen, writer
 Sarah Kendzior, journalist and author
 Stephen King, writer
 Sally Kohn, journalist, political commentator, CEO of Movement Vision Lab
 R. O. Kwon, writer
 Thanhha Lai, writer
 Jay Lender, animator and writer
 Damon Lindelof, writer and producer
 R. Zamora Linmark, writer
 J. Kenji López-Alt, writer
 Jeffrey Marsh, writer, actor, artist, non-binary rights activist
 Heather McGhee, political commentator and former president of Demos
 Courtney Milan, writer
 Lawrence Mishel, distinguished fellow at the Economic Policy Institute
 Kevin Nadal, author, activist, comedian, and professor of psychology at John Jay College of Criminal Justice and The Graduate Center of the City University of New York
 Celeste Ng, writer
 Christopher Noxon, writer and journalist
 Marti Noxon, writer, director, and producer
 Robyn Ochs, activist and editor of Bi Women Quarterly
 Dan Santat, writer and illustrator
 Rebecca Solnit, writer
 Cheryl Strayed, writer
 Laurence Tribe, Carl M. Loeb University Professor at Harvard Law School
 Monique Truong, writer
 Esmé Weijun Wang, writer
 Chuck Wendig, author, comic book writer, screenwriter, and blogger
 Raquel Willis, writer, executive editor of Out, and transgender rights activist
 Bill Wolkoff, writer and director
 Jeff Yang, writer and journalist

Organizations

Labor unions
 AFT - American Federation of Teachers (Massachusetts), representing 23,000 (co-endorsement with Bernie Sanders and Joe Biden)
 National Union of Healthcare Workers, representing 15,000 (co-endorsement with Bernie Sanders)

Newspapers 
 The Austin Chronicle
The Boston Globe
 The Des Moines Register
 The New York Times, (co-endorsement with Amy Klobuchar)
 The Storm Lake Times

Political organizations
EMILY's List
Lambda Independent Democrats of Brooklyn
National Organization for Women (NOW) PAC
 Progressive Change Campaign Committee
 Stonewall Democratic Club of New York
 Working Families Party

References

External links
 
Official website

Elizabeth Warren
Warren, Elizabeth
Warren, Elizabeth